Pat "the Cope" Gallagher (born 10 March 1948) is a former Irish Fianna Fáil politician who served as Leas-Cheann Comhairle of Dáil Éireann from 2016 to 2020 and as a Minister of State from 1987 to 1994 and from 2002 to 2008. He served as a Teachta Dála (TD) from 1981 to 1997, 2002 to 2009 and 2016 to 2020, and as a Member of the European Parliament (MEP) from 1994 to 2002 and from 2009 to 2014.

Background
Gallagher was born in Burtonport, a fishing port in The Rosses in the west of County Donegal. He is the grandson of Paddy 'the Cope' Gallagher, of the Irish Co-Operative movement. He was educated at Dungloe Secondary School – Rosses Community School, Coláiste Éinde in Salthill and at University College Galway (UCG), where he graduated with a Bachelor of Commerce in 1970. He worked as a fish exporter until 1982, becoming involved in local politics in 1979.

Family
His middle name 'The Cope' refers to his family connection to The Cope agricultural cooperative which operates in The Rosses area of west Donegal. This name is used in his profile on the Fianna Fáil website and on the European Parliament website. Gallagher was a member of the European Parliament's Committee on Fisheries and also serves as Chairman of the delegation for relations with Switzerland, Iceland and Norway and to the European Economic Area (EEA) Joint Parliamentary Committee.

Gallagher's wife, Ann Gillespie, and her sister, Eibhlin, both served almost 10 years of a 15-year sentence for conspiracy and explosive charges. In 1974, the sisters were visiting a house in Manchester when a bomb being made there exploded.

Gillespie maintains her innocence, saying police used evidence from a discredited scientist, Frank Skuse, but does not wish to reopen the case. In 2005, Gillespie's solicitor Gareth Peirce stated that she believed the case could have been successfully re-opened.

Political career
Gallagher was first elected to Dáil Éireann at the 1981 general election, retaining his seat until retiring at the 1997 general election. Gallagher was appointed Minister of State at the Department of Marine from 12 March 1987 to 12 July 1988. He was appointed Minister of State at the Department of the Gaeltacht in July 1987, serving in that post until 11 February 1992 and again in the same post from 13 February 1992 until 12 January 1993. He was appointed Minister of State at the Department of the Arts, Culture and the Gaeltacht on 14 January 1993.

In 1994, he was elected to the European Parliament as an MEP for the Connacht–Ulster constituency, and was re-elected at the 1999 European Parliament election. During his period in Europe, Gallagher was a member of a number of committees including Fisheries, Economics and Monetary and Industry and Energy.

He returned to domestic politics to successfully contest the 2002 general election, and was appointed Minister of State at the Department of the Environment and Local Government in June 2002. In Taoiseach Bertie Ahern's reshuffle in 2004, he was appointed Minister of State at the Department of Environment and Local Government and at the Department of Communications, Marine and Natural Resources from 29 September 2004 to 14 February 2006. Following a period in this role, Gallagher was appointed as Minister of State at the Department of Transport from 14 February 2006 where he served until 14 June 2007. From 20 June 2007 to 12 May 2008, he served as Minister of State at the Department of Health and Children with special responsibility for Health Promotion and Food Safety. He was not re-appointed after Brian Cowen became Taoiseach in May 2008.

He was elected as an MEP for the North-West constituency at the 2009 European Parliament election. Immediately thereafter, Gallagher replaced Brian Crowley as the head of Fianna Fáil's European delegation; this promotion came in the aftermath of Crowley publicly attacking the party's decision to join the European Liberal Democrat and Reform Party. Gallagher was a member of the European Parliament's Committee on Fisheries.

Gallagher lost his seat at the 2014 European Parliament election.

In the 2016 general election, he ran alongside sitting TD Charlie McConalogue as the two Fianna Fáil candidates in the new five-seat Donegal constituency. Gallagher was elected on the 11th count, after McConalogue was elected on the first count. He lost his seat at the 2020 general election, with Pádraig Mac Lochlainn winning back the seat Gallagher had won at his expense in 2016.

References

External links

Pat the Cope Gallagher's page on the Fianna Fáil website

1948 births
Living people
Alumni of the University of Galway
Fianna Fáil MEPs
Fianna Fáil TDs
Members of the 22nd Dáil
Members of the 23rd Dáil
Members of the 24th Dáil
Members of the 25th Dáil
Members of the 26th Dáil
Members of the 27th Dáil
Members of the 29th Dáil
Members of the 30th Dáil
Members of the 32nd Dáil
MEPs for the Republic of Ireland 1994–1999
MEPs for the Republic of Ireland 1999–2004
MEPs for the Republic of Ireland 2009–2014
Ministers of State of the 25th Dáil
Ministers of State of the 26th Dáil
Ministers of State of the 27th Dáil
Ministers of State of the 29th Dáil
Ministers of State of the 30th Dáil
People educated at Coláiste Éinde
People in food and agriculture occupations
Local councillors in County Donegal
Politicians from County Donegal